Dušan Kolarević (Serbian Cyrillic: Душан Коларевић; born 19 April 1987) is a former Serbian footballer who played as a midfielder.

His father, also named Dušan, owns a company in Ćićevac, engaged in wood economy.

References

External links
 
 Dušan Kolarević stats at utakmica.rs 
 

1987 births
Living people
Sportspeople from Niš
Serbian footballers
Serbian expatriate footballers
Serbian expatriate sportspeople in Austria
Expatriate footballers in Austria
SC Rheindorf Altach players
OFK Bečej 1918 players
FK Radnički Beograd players
FK Hajduk Beograd players
FK Čukarički players
FK Sinđelić Niš players
FK Radnički Niš players
FK Rad players
OFK Beograd players
Association football midfielders